Wingate School may refer to:
A former name of Wingate University in the United States
Wingate School (Spain)
The Wingate School (Mexico)